BioSteel Sports Nutrition Inc. is a Canadian company based in Toronto that produces dietary supplement products for athletes and exercise enthusiasts.

History 
Officially founded in 2009 by John Celenza and former NHL player Mike Cammalleri, BioSteel sports drink was originally sold to professional teams and franchises.

In 2010, Gary Roberts reported that hockey players were drinking BioSteel during a Hockey Night in Canada playoff broadcast which led to BioSteel's expansion of their distribution to general consumers. BioSteel is distributed through grocery stores and retail channels across Canada.

In October 2019, Canopy Growth, a Canadian cannabis producer, acquired a 72% stake in BioSteel, with plans to introduce cannabidiol-infused BioSteel products to the market.

BioSteel agreed to a multiyear partnership for sports drinks with the National Hockey League and National Hockey League Players' Association in 2022.

Hockey camp
BioSteel holds an annual hockey training session of NHL players in Toronto, which lasts four days in late August. Nichol and Gary Roberts, former NHL player, partnered to create a super camp for Toronto-area hockey players. The event, created and organized by BioSteel, is an annual training session before traditional NHL training camps begin. Known as "#Camp," the event takes place at St. Michael's College School Arena. By its second year in 2011, there were 20 NHL players and 16 top prospects in attendance.

All-Canadian basketball game
In 2015, BioSteel and the Athlete Institute launched the high school BioSteel All-Canadian Basketball Game. The competition featured a dunk contest and a three-point contest at Orangeville, Ontario's Athlete  Institute, and an all-star game at Ryerson University's Mattamy Centre. The top 24 high schoolers from across Canada took part in the event.

Commercial partners
BioSteel is used by 28 NHL franchises, 14 NBA organizations, 18 MLB teams, and numerous golfers.

BioSteel announced an official partnership with the Toronto Raptors in 2015. The Raptors training facility, which opened in February 2016, was named BioSteel Centre until 2018.

References

External links
Official website

Dietary supplements
Food and drink companies based in Toronto
Manufacturing companies based in Toronto